Musk turtle is the common name given to three genera of aquatic turtles, all in the New World family Kinosternidae: 

Sternotherus, the musk turtles proper 
Staurotypus, variously called Mexican, three-keeled, or giant musk turtles
Claudius, the narrow-bridged musk turtle

Animal common name disambiguation pages